Thospia is a genus of snout moths. It was described by Ragonot in 1888.

Species
 Thospia crassipalpella Ragonot, 1888
 Thospia feminella Roesler, 1973
 Thospia permixtella Ragonot, 1888
 Thospia trifasciella (Ragonot, 1887)
 Thospia tshetverikovi Kuznetzov, 1908

References

Phycitini
Pyralidae genera